Zamua (also Mazamua) was an ancient Pre-Iranian kingdom, corresponding with the earlier kingdom of Lullubi, which stretched from lake Urmia to the upper reaches of the Diyala River, roughly corresponding with the modern Sulaimania governorate (still called Zamua/Zamwa by the Kurds) in Iraqi Kurdistan. It was centered at Sharazur plain. Ameka and Arashtua were two southern Zamuan kingdoms. A tribal chief (Nasiku) bearing the Akkadian name of Nūr-Adad was a Zamuan leader who launched a failed resistance against Assyrian domination. Its inhabitants were most probably related to the Gutians living east and south of Zamua, and the Hurrians living northwest of the Kingdom.

Inner Zamua
The northern regions of Zamua (towards lake Urmia) were known as Inner Zamua. Ida was the most important state in Inner Zamua, with Nikdera one of its most important rulers.

Citations

Sulaymaniyah Governorate